KLFA may refer to:

 KLFA-LD, a low-power television station (channel 25) licensed to serve Santa Maria, California, United States
 Kuala Lumpur FA
 Kenya Land and Freedom Army